WIPAHS (World Islamic Propagation and Humanitarian Services) is an independent non governmental organization (NGO), registered as a charitable humanitarian trust in Tanzania.

History
In the month of Ramadhan 1984, a group of friends got together with the sole purpose of improving the well-being of the local community.

This group of friends began work by distributing Islamic books, Qur'ans and learning aids to local schools and Madrasahs. The local population lived in poverty and access to many areas proved difficult. It was also very difficult for the local people to have access to clean water.

This observation inspired the idea of digging wells in remote areas, especially near mosques, Madrasahs, schools, and populated villages.

The members were also forced to review their activities and decided to give special attention to the aspect of education and women. This led to the initiation of the Wali Ul Asr Education Centre (WEC).

Objectives
Propagating the message of peace through the teachings of Islam.
Eradicating Poverty through education.
Helping to fight diseases and malnutrition through "Give Water to the Thirsty Projects"
Economic upliftment of the under-privileged through sponsoring and initiating economic programmes, thus creating self-sustaining individuals in the country.

Projects

Water Program

Wipahs has dug nearly 218 shallow wells in Dar es Salaam and other regions, like Coast and Singida; providing approximately 2500 litres of drinkable water daily for 300 families.

This shallow well project is carried out under the Kerbala Shallow Well Project.

Medical

WIPAHS is also concerned with the carrying out of medical projects.
It has successfully done the following:
Provided free sunglasses
Provided medical equipment and hospital necessities

Education
Under the Wali-Ul-Asr Education Centre (WEC), WIPAHS has built different learning institutions. They are:

Umme Abiha Nursery School (UANS)
Kibaha English Medium Primary School (KEMPS)
Wali Ul Asr Girls Seminary (WISEM)
Wali Ul Asr Boys Seminary (WBS)
Coast Teachers Training Institute (CTTI)
Muslim Teachers Training College (MTTC)

Economic upliftment
WIPAHS has initiated a scheme of creating employment and economic upliftment through provision of assets to the local community such as sewing machines and bicycles or sponsoring small-scale businesses.

Apart from cash loans, WIPAHS provides sewing machines, ploughs and bicycles at subsidized costs, so as to boost income of the underprivileged members of the society.

See also
Al Itrah Broadcasting Network Television

References

Islamic organisations based in Tanzania
Organizations established in 1984
1984 establishments in Tanzania